Guzmania condensata is a plant species in the genus Guzmania. This species is native to Costa Rica and Colombia.

References

condensata
Flora of Costa Rica
Flora of Colombia
Plants described in 1903